Atokatheridium is an extinct genus of Deltatheridiidae from Cretaceous of United States.

References

Prehistoric metatherians
Cretaceous mammals of North America
Fossils of the United States
Fossil taxa described in 2001
Prehistoric mammal genera